Mycoprotein (lit. "fungus protein") is a form of single-cell protein, also known as fungal protein, derived from fungi for human consumption. The only commercial mycoprotein is marketed under the brand name Quorn, currently sold in 17 countries. It is a fermented product with a doughy consistency and slight mushroom flavor. 

Quorn was approved for use in the United Kingdom in 1983 and the United States in 2001.

Though it is generally well tolerated, some studies indicate that mycoprotein may cause allergic reactions in some people.

History 
The only mycoprotein on sale in Europe and North America is called Quorn, created from Fusarium venenatum. In the 1960s F. venenatum was identified by the British company, Rank Hovis McDougall, as a potential protein source for humans. F. venenatum was one of more than 3,000 species of fungi screened during a three-year period for being cheap to reproduce in fungiculture, nutritious, and palatable. Concerns for pathogen-potential of the species on plants led to a twelve-year testing process. After this period F. venenatum was allowed to be sold on the English market, at the time its most thoroughly tested food product.  F. venenatum is the only source of mycoprotein that can produce a high percentage of protein biomass approved for market.

Synthesis 
The fungus is grown in vats using glucose syrup as its food. A fermentation vat is filled with the growth medium and then inoculated with the fungal spores. The F. venenatum culture respires aerobically, so for it to grow at an optimum rate, it is supplied with oxygen, and carbon dioxide is drawn from the vat. To make protein, nitrogen (in the form of ammonia) is added and vitamins and minerals needed to support growth. The vat is kept at a constant temperature, also optimized for growth; the fungus can double its mass every five hours.

When the desired amount of mycoprotein has been created, the growth medium is drawn off from a tap at the bottom of the fermenter. The mycoprotein is separated and purified. It is a pale yellow solid with a faint taste of mushrooms. Different flavors and tastes can be added to the mycoprotein to add variety.

A reproducible mutation occurs after 1,000 to 1,200 hours of cultivation in F. venenatum that greatly reduces the hypha length in the organism, which is considered unfavorable for production. Under normal conditions, this mutant strain will rapidly displace the parent strain. Replacing ammonia with nitrate as the source of nitrogen, or supplementing ammonium cultures with peptone, prevents this mutant strain from overtaking the product, but still allows development. Alternatively, the appearance of the mutant can be delayed by selection pressures such as nutrient concentrations or pH levels.

Health concerns 
Some strains of F. venenatum produce a variety of mycotoxins, such as type A trichothecenes. Mycotoxin-producing genes such as isotrichodermin, isotricodermol, sambucinol, apo-trichothecen, culmorin, culmorone, and enniatin B can be found in cultures of F. venenatum. Specific strains that do not produce mycotoxins under optimal conditions can be selected to reduce the danger to human consumers. Testing at six-hour intervals can be done to monitor mycotoxin presence.

There is continual testing for concerns of allergic reactions, which can range from abdominal pain, nausea, and vomiting to severe asthmatic reactions, especially when crossed with inhaled mold spores.

Nutrition potential 
Mycoprotein is able to provide greater satiety than traditional protein sources such as chicken, while also being low in caloric content. Mycoprotein is rich in fiber and protein content, but very low in fat, making it a desirable food source for consumers trying to limit fat intake while still participating in a high protein diet.

F. venenatum's high fiber content also has potential in managing blood sugar levels. The mechanism that links fiber content and F. venenatum's effect on managing glycemia and insulenaemia is not completely understood, but it is known to decrease the rate of glucose absorption and insulin secretion and it helps mitigate the maximum limit an amount of insulin can process glucose, known as insulin peak.

Under optimum conditions F. venenatum biomass can be 42% protein while also functioning as a prebiotic material for the lower gut.

See also 
 Protein quality

References

Further reading

Fungal proteins
Meat substitutes
Single-cell protein